Trevor Halstead (born 17 June 1976 in Margate, KwaZulu-Natal) is a former South African rugby union footballer. His position is centre. He is 1.85m tall, weighs 100 kg, and won 6 caps for the Springboks.

In 2006 he scored in Munster's Semi-final and Final victories in the Heineken European Cup. In total he played 41 games for Munster and scored 8 tries.

Trevor attended Kearsney College.

References

External links
Munster Profile

1976 births
Living people
South African rugby union players
South Africa international rugby union players
Munster Rugby players
South African people of English descent
Sharks (rugby union) players
Sharks (Currie Cup) players
Rugby union players from KwaZulu-Natal
Rugby union centres
Alumni of Kearsney College